The Cunningham Steam Wagon was a product of the Massachusetts Steam Wagon Company of Pittsfield, Massachusetts, United States.

The firm was established in December 1900, with the intention of manufacturing the products that the Cunningham Engineering Company of Boston, Massachusetts, planned to develop. Instead, they built a small steam powered truck with four wheel drive. Production ceased at the end of 1901.

There is no relationship known to the Cunningham automobile from Rochester, N.Y.

The truck was the product of  The Cunningham Engineering Co., located in the Tremont Bldg, of Boston.  It was reported that vehicles of three, six, and eight tons were being built as of October, 1900.  The frame and cab were constructed of iron. The axles were of steel, 2-1/2 inches in diameter carrying steek sleeves and differential gears. The engine was a compound comprising two pairs of high and low-pressure cylinders sized 5 X 3 - 5 and was designed for 200 psi operation and 300 rpm.

In an extreme rarity for the time, the truck was 4 wheel drive with both the front and rear axles  being chain driven from the engine by way of Cunningham hydraulic clutches attached to each axle.

References
 

Trucks
Defunct motor vehicle manufacturers of the United States
Vehicle manufacturing companies established in 1900
Motor vehicle manufacturers based in Massachusetts
Defunct manufacturing companies based in Massachusetts